Charbagh is an administrative subdivision (tehsil) of Swat District in the Khyber Pakhtunkhwa province of Pakistan.

District Swat has seven tehsils: Tehsil Charbagh, Tehsil Babuzai, Tehsil Matta, Tehsil Khwaza Khela, Tehsil Barikot, Tehsil Kabal and Tehsil Bahrain. Each tehsil comprises certain numbers of union councils. There are 65 union councils in Swat District, 56 rural and 9 urban.

According to Khyber Pakhtunkhwa Local Government Act 2013. Tehsil Charbagh has following five wards:

 Charbagh I
 Charbagh II
 Gulibagh
 Taligram
 Kishwara

University of Swat 800 meter away from Charbagh bazaar situated in Allahabad, Cadet College Swat, a premier educational institution of the province, is in Gulibagh and also the private university town are in this tehsil.

Population 
The population Charbagh is 39,605. According to the 2017 census the population of tehsil Charbagh is 126,115. Charbagh tehsil has a population density of 934.9/km2.

See also 

Charbagh, Swat
Swat District

References

External links
Khyber-Pakhtunkhwa Government website section on Lower Dir and neighboring places
United Nations
Hajj 2014 Uploads
 PBS paiman.jsi.com 

Swat District
Tehsils of Swat District
Populated places in Swat District